Meri Zaat Zarra-e-Benishan is a Pakistani television drama series, directed by Babar Javed and produced by Abdullah Kadwani and Humayun Saeed, based on Umera Ahmad's novel of the same name. The series is about Saba, a woman torn between faith, fidelity and forgiveness and the story spans across two generations and then focuses  on her daughter, Sara. It has an ensemble cast consisting of Samiya Mumtaz, Samina Peerzada, Sarwat Gillani, Mehreen Raheel, Faisal Qureshi, Adnan Siddiqui, Imran Abbas, Ismat Zaidi, and Humayun Saeed.

Plot
Sara arrives at the home of Arfeen Abbas . She gives him a letter, which upsets him when he reads it. Arfeen asks Sara where "Saba" is, and she replies that she died four days earlier. He collapses, regains his composure and asks Sara for her address so they can collect her belongings. When they arrive at Sara's modest home, they go to Saba's bedroom to gather her things. Arfeen finds a pair of Saba's old sandals, and begins to cry; Sara wonders why he is so grief-stricken. They return to Arfeen's estate and he introduces Sara to his son, Haider.
It is learned that Saba was Sara's mother and Arfeen's cousin. Although Saba and Arfeen were in love, Saba was treated badly by most of the family—especially Arfeen's mother —because of her liberal views. When Arfeen tells his parents that he wants to marry Saba, they object. He says that if he cannot marry her he will not marry at all, and they relent.

Sara and Haider become friends and she becomes accustomed to living in Arfeen's home, although she wonders what happened between him and her mother; when she visits her family, no one will tell her. Arfeen, who does not want Sara to leave his house, wants Haider to marry her. Haider, unready for marriage, is reluctant but finally agrees; Sara also agrees to the union. On their wedding day, she disappears. Arfeen panics, and asks Sara's aunt Aqsa if she told Sara what had happened; she says no. Arfeen tells Haider the story.

Saba and Arfeen married, but his parents and sisters were unhappy. Arfeen's mother sends him to get his younger sister from her in-laws' house the day before Saba's rukhsati, and asks Saba to make up the spare bedroom. Saba finds Aadil, a cousin who was attracted to her and whom Arfeen's mother had asked to fix a curtain rod, in the bedroom. While they work, the bedroom door closes; they pound on the door to no avail. Arfeen's mother and most of the rest of the family then come to the door, and she accuses Saba and Aadil of inappropriate behaviour. No one believes their denials, and Arfeen's father threatens to kill them both. Aadil's mother begs him to run for his life, and Saba is mercilessly beaten; not even her mother and sister believe her. Arfeen hears about this and questions Saba, who maintains her innocence. He asks her to swear on the Quran that she is innocent; she agrees if his mother will also take the oath. Saba mistakenly thinks that her aunt is too religious to lie on the Quran, however, she does lie while keeping her hand on the Quran and Arfeen reluctantly divorces her right there.

He marries a woman in the United States, but is still in love with Saba; she is married off to an abusive 50-year-old father of four, who mistrusts her due to Arfeen's father. No one from her family visits her during her second marriage. Saba becomes pregnant and her husband, refusing to believe that the child is his, divorces her. She becomes a maid, gives birth to a girl, and blames herself for what has happened.

Arfeen and his wife have a son, but their marriage is unhappy. In Pakistan, one of Arfeen's sisters loses her husband; his younger sister is divorced, and his mother is diagnosed with cancer. On her deathbed, she admits that she lied because she was jealous of Saba. Saba visits her aunt before she dies, and tells everyone that she's forgiven them. Arfeen divorces his wife and asks Saba to marry him; she says that she still loves him, but cannot trust him. Her parents ask her to return to them, but she disappears.

Several years later, Saba works at a garment factory owned by Arfeen. She is friendly with Haider, but covers her face to hide her identity until her death. In the present, it is found out that Sara overheard how her mother was treated by Arfeen's family and ran away. Haider tracks her down and explains everything; Sara forgives the family, and the couple begin a new life.

Cast

First generation
 Khayyam Sarhadi as Qasim Abbas, the eldest brother and father of Arfeen and his two sisters.
 Shehryar Zaidi as Farid Abbas, Aadil's father, the younger brother who hates his son after the incident.
 Shakeel as Karim Abbas, Saba and Aqsa's father, the youngest brother; both his daughters are educated.
 Samina Peerzada as Shakeela Abbas, Arfeen's mother, who hates Saba and destroys her life.
 Afshan Qureshi as Aadil's mother, who likes Saba and wants her son to marry her.
 Ismat Zaidi as Safia (Saba and Aqsa's mother), who sides against her daughter and is angry when the truth is revealed.

Second generation
 Samiya Mumtaz as Saba Kareem, who marries Arfeen and Amin; the latter is socially and economically inferior to her
 Faisal Qureshi as Arfeen Abbas, who marries Saba and Mahroosh
 Adnan Siddiqui as Aadil, Arfeen and Saba's cousin, who is falsely accused of inappropriate behaviour with her
 Zeba Ali as Aasiya, Qasim's daughter, who is later divorced
 Rashid Farooqui as Amin, Saba's second husband, who throws her out of the house
 Mehreen Raheel as Mahroosh, Arfeen's second wife who is the opposite of Saba
 Humayun Saeed as Shuja, Arfeen and Mahroosh's friend
 Lubna Aslam as Arfeen's elder sister, who throws Saba out of her house and is later widowed
 Fatima Effendi as Young Aqsa
 Azra Mohyeddin as Bibi, Saba works in her house

Third generation
 Imran Abbas Naqvi as Haydar Abbas, Mahroosh and Arfeen's son, who marries Sara
 Sarwat Gilani as Sara, Saba and Amin's daughter
 Nausheen Shah as Old Aqsa, who loves Sara and despises her paternal cousins
 Sanam Agha as Maya, Haider's friend

Guest appearance
Ayesha Omar as Gul, Sara's friend

Theme song
The series' theme song, "Meri Zaat Zarra-e-Benishan", was written by Sabir Zafar and sung by Rahat Fateh Ali Khan.

Reception

Viewership 
It received highest TRPs of 5 which was declared as unprecedented by the producer. According to the producer Abdullah Kadwani, "The serial received a phenomenal 1,68,000 emails and 6.3 million hits on various websites." A local salesman after one year of the serial also reported that they sold an average of 100 DVDs of the series every month.

Critical reception 
A reviewer from Dawn praised the acting performances of Mumtaz and Gillani, and title song by Rahat Fateh Ali Khan but criticised for the depiction of time period. In March 2020, Sadaf Haider of DAWN Images listed it among the 10 iconic Pakistani TV dramas.

International broadcast
The 20-episode series was telecast on Zindagi in India as Kaisi Ye Qayamat from 15 December 2014 to 6 January 2015.

Awards

References

External links
 
 Pakistani TV Serials Portal

2009 Pakistani television series debuts
2010 Pakistani television series endings
Geo TV original programming
Pakistani drama television series
Urdu-language television shows
Zee Zindagi original programming